The Orto Botanico Friulano is a botanical garden at a location variously described as near the Istituto Tecnico per Geometri on Viale Leonardo da Vinci, or Via Urbanis, Udine, Friuli-Venezia Giulia, Italy.

The garden was established in 1951 and contains collections of irises, local flora, Ericaceae, succulents, ferns, arid and desert plants, tropical trees, and Platanus orientalis. The garden's herbarium, housed within the Museo Friulano di Storia Natural, contains about 100,000 specimens.

See also 
 List of botanical gardens in Italy

References 
 BGCI entry
 Horti entry
 V. J. Jirasek, "List of Botanical Gardens and Institutes Offering Seeds of Plants Collected from Indigenous Habitats ", Taxon, Vol. 32, No. 4 (Nov., 1983), pp. 584–597.

Botanical gardens in Italy
Buildings and structures in Udine
Gardens in Friuli-Venezia Giulia